Hemigomphus comitatus is a species of dragonfly of the family Gomphidae, 
known as the zebra vicetail. 
It is endemic to northern Queensland, Australia, where it inhabits streams and rivers.

Description
Hemigomphus comitatus is a small dragonfly with black and yellow markings. Its wingspan is 50-55mm and overall length is 40-45mm. The eyes of the adult are green and do not meet at the top of the head. The head of the female has a spine from the occiput just behind the eyes. The synthorax is strongly marked with black and yellow stripes, with the humeral stripe usually being continuous. A black mark along the suture of the synthorax is usually broken above and below the metastigma. The abdomen is black with prominent yellow bands, the appendages of the male are yellow and curve inwards at the tip. The wing margin at the base of the hindwing is folded in the male, but uniformly curved in the female.

Distribution
Hemigomphus comitatus has been recorded from near Mackay, Queensland to northern regions of Cape York Peninsula, usually along the coastal strip and nearby mountain ranges.

Habitat
Hemigomphus comitatus is known to inhabit streams and rivers, not necessarily in rainforest. The exemplar pictured here was found in suburban Cairns near a seasonal storm-water creek.

Gallery

See also
 List of Odonata species of Australia

References

Gomphidae
Odonata of Australia
Insects of Australia
Endemic fauna of Australia
Taxa named by Robert John Tillyard
Insects described in 1909